"It Ain't Gonna Rain No Mo'" or "It Ain't Gonna Rain No More"  is a song by "The Red-Headed Music Maker", singer and instrumentalist Wendell Hall (1896–1969). Hall's 1923 recording of it was a hit in the US and also in Britain, where it was sung during the 1925 FA Cup final by Sheffield United supporters, making it a popular football song of the era.

This song is an example of the folk tradition of transmission with local variants. Antecedents from the 19th century are known. Carl Sandburg suggested that the song goes back at least to the 1870s and includes verses in his American Songbag (1927). By the 1920s many variants were already extant in popular culture. Mr. Hall most likely codified what already existed and added original verses.

The song may be somewhat familiar to modern listeners because of its use in a number of films, especially vintage animated cartoons, typically in the form of a brief vocal refrain or as an instrumental musical comment. It is featured at the end of a 1930 Pathé Studios cartoon titled Noah Knew His Ark, and part of it is sung in The Plumber, a 1933 Oswald the Lucky Rabbit cartoon. This tradition has continued into modern times: a part of the song was sung in the 2014 film Against the Sun and was also featured over the end credits.

In 1991 Greg & Steve recorded the song along with Rain Rain Go Away from their album Playing Favorites

In 2019, the song entered the public domain in the United States.

1923 songs
1924 singles